Laurinburg Institute is a historic African American preparatory school in Laurinburg, North Carolina. The school was founded in 1904 by Emmanuel Monty and Tinny McDuffie at the request of Booker T. Washington. Emmanuel McDuffie was a graduate from Snow Hill Normal and Industrial Institute.

The school is noted for its output of highly accomplished alumni, including a rich basketball tradition, having produced several All-Americans, collegiate players, international players, and NBA players.

Notable alumni
Antonio Anderson, NBA player
Renaldo Balkman, NBA player
Spider Bennett, ABA player
Joe Budden, broadcaster, songwriter, and former rapper
Wes Covington, MLB player
Charlie Davis, NBA player
Joey Dorsey, NBA player
Robert Dozier, PBA player
Arvydas Eitutavičius, Lithuanian professional basketball player
Mike Evans, NBA player and coach
Dizzy Gillespie, musician
Chris Johnson, NBA player
Sam Jones, member of the Basketball Hall of Fame, 10x NBA champion and 5x NBA All-Star
Earl "The Goat" Manigault, street basketball player
Grachan Moncur III, jazz trombonist
Billy Reid, NBA Player
Quantez Robertson, BBL player
Magnum Rolle, Bahamian professional basketball player
Charlie Scott, member of the Basketball Hall of Fame, 3x NBA All-Star and NBA champion in 1976
Jimmy Walker, NBA player
Chris Washburn, NBA player
Dexter Westbrook, ABA player
Shawne Williams, NBA player

References

Schools in Scotland County, North Carolina
Private high schools in North Carolina
1904 establishments in North Carolina
Educational institutions established in 1904